Pazar may refer to:

Places
Pazar, Hormozgan, a village in the Iranian province Hormozgan
Pazar, Iran, a village in the Iranian province Yazd
Pazar, Rize, a town in the Turkish province Rize
Pazar, Tokat, a district in the Turkish province Tokat

Other
Elma Pazar, a contestant on the British dating game show Love Island
Goran Pazar, a character on the American TV show Barry